Jenny Ellaug Følling (born 19 March 1962) is a Norwegian politician for the Centre Party.

She was elected as a deputy representative to the Parliament of Norway from Sogn og Fjordane in 2013. As Liv Signe Navarsete from Sogn og Fjordane was a member of the outgoing Stoltenberg's Second Cabinet, Følling met as a regular representative during the two weeks before the cabinet change.

She resides in Bygstad in Gaular.

References

1962 births
Living people
People from Gaular
Sogn og Fjordane politicians
Centre Party (Norway) politicians
Members of the Storting
Women members of the Storting